Coronation is a town in east-central Alberta, Canada that is surrounded by the County of Paintearth No. 18.

History 

Coronation was incorporated as a village on December 16, 1911, the year George V came to the throne hence its chosen name, then was officially declared a town on April 29, 1912. After moving south from the Haneyville, some distance north of its present location to be congruent with rail lines, Coronation was expected to be a hub town. However, larger towns such as Calgary and Red Deer began to evolve into cities and Coronation was forgotten in that regard.

Relying on its farming population, Coronation eventually erected three grain elevators which remained landmarks until their destruction in the summer of 2002. Other landmarks include the water tower that was remodeled in the late 1990s, the caboose that is painted a regal red, and the lighted crown at the town's entrance that was built by a team of Hutterites in the early 2000s.

Geography

Climate 
Coronation experiences a humid continental climate (Köppen climate classification Dfb).

Demographics 

In the 2016 Census of Population conducted by Statistics Canada, the Town of Coronation recorded a population of 940 living in 405 of its 442 total private dwellings, a  change from its 2011 population of 947.

Economy 
The economy is supported primarily by farming, ranching, and the oil patch.

Culture 
Coronation hosts a rodeo every June that includes calf roping, barrel racing, bull riding and chuckwagon events. The rodeo also features a parade and a pancake breakfast.

Coronation also hosts the Coronation Town and Country Fair, which includes exhibits such as academic displays, botanical achievements and artistic entries.

Education 
The Clearview School District operates Coronation School within the town, which had 374 students in 2009.

Media 
The East Central Alberta Review is the local newspaper that provides coverage for Coronation.

Notable people 
 Travis Brigley - former NHL player
 Barbara Clark - bronze medalist in swimming
 Melody Davidson - Olympic gold medalist, head coach of Canadian women's hockey team
 Stuart Gillard - film director
 Doug Griffiths - author and former politician
 Dwayne Zinger - former NHL player

References

Further reading

External links 

1911 establishments in Alberta
County of Paintearth No. 18
Towns in Alberta